The 1922 Tulsa Golden Hurricane football team represented the University of Tulsa during the 1922 college football season. In their first year under head coach Howard Acher, Tulas compiled an 8–0 record and outscored their opponents by a total of 156 to 60. The team's victories included wins over Texas A&M (13–10), TCU (2–0), and Arkansas (13–6).

Schedule

† Tulsa states "Mutually agreed not to play the game," while Oklahoma State deems this a "mutual forfeit."

References

Tulsa
Tulsa Golden Hurricane football seasons
Tulsa Golden Hurricane football